Ralph Wrenn (died 26 March 1692) was an English naval Commodore.

Naval career
On 18 April 1672 Wrenn was appointed commander of the Hopewell fireship, and in the following year of the Rose dogger.

After Kempthorne's death Wrenn took the command and beat off the enemy. His gallantry was rewarded by a promotion to the command of the Nonsuch on 9 August 1681. In May 1682 he was moved into the Centurion, to which, still in the Mediterranean, he was reappointed in May 1685.

In 1690, however, he was appointed to the Norwich of forty-eight guns, and in October 1691 was ordered out to the Jamaica Station. He sailed from Plymouth on 26 December, and after a most favourable passage arrived at Barbados on 16 January 1691 – 1692, when his force consisted of the Mary and, besides the Norwich, five fourth-rates, ships of from forty to fifty guns. He had orders to send one of these with the trade to Jamaica; but, receiving intelligence that the French were in greater force than had been supposed, he detached two on this duty. Then, on a report that a squadron of nine French ships was cruising off Barbados, he strengthened his force with two hired merchant ships, and put to sea on 30 January. Not meeting with the enemy in a cruise of five days, he returned to Barbados, and, apprehending that the whole French fleet had gone to Jamaica, he sailed again on 17 February. On the 21st off Desirade he sighted the French fleet of more than three times his strength—eighteen ships of from forty to sixty guns, with some six or seven fireships and tenders. In face of such odds, Wrenn drew back, but was the next morning attacked by their full force. After a sharp action of four hours' duration, Wrenn found himself able to draw off and retire unpursued—‘the bravest action performed in the West Indies during the war’. He returned to Barbados, where a sickness carried off a great many of the men, and, among others, Wrenn himself.

References

Sources

Lediard, Thomas, (1735), Naval History pp. 653–655

Further reading
Charnock, John, (1756-1807) Biographia Navalis i., publ. London, R. Faulder, 1795,  page 380
 Clowes, W. Laird (William Laird), Sir, 1856–1905;, et al., The Royal Navy : a History from the Earliest Times to the Present, Publ. 1897  London : S. Low, Marston and company, limited, pp.465
Philip Howard Colomb, Naval Warfare, pp. 258–9.

17th-century Royal Navy personnel
1692 deaths
Royal Navy commodores
Year of birth unknown
British military personnel of the Nine Years' War